Anolis griseus, the Saint Vincent's tree anole or Saint Vincent tree anole, is a species of anole lizard.

Geographic range
It is endemic to Saint Vincent, an island in the Caribbean Lesser Antilles that is part of Saint Vincent and the Grenadines.  It is one of two anole species on Saint Vincent, the other being the much smaller A. trinitatis.

Description
Saint Vincent's tree anole can reach a length of 136 mm snout-to-vent.  Its dorsal surface is mossy gray-brown, occasionally with a yellow tint on its face and limbs.  Its belly is pale green or yellow-gray, and its dewlap is dull orange.  It has irregular dark markings on its body.

Behavior
It usually perches high, but sometimes descends to the ground.

See also
List of Anolis lizards

References

.

External links
Anolis griseus at the Encyclopedia of Life
Anolis griseus at the Reptile Database

Anoles
Lizards of the Caribbean
Fauna of Saint Vincent and the Grenadines
Reptiles described in 1887
Taxa named by Samuel Garman